Hendricksville is an unincorporated community in Beech Creek Township, Greene County, Indiana.

History
Hendricksville was likely named for Philip Hendricks, a pioneer. A post office was established at Hendricksville in 1888, and remained in operation until it was discontinued in 1921.

Geography

References

Unincorporated communities in Greene County, Indiana
Unincorporated communities in Indiana